Nikan may refer to:

Nikan High School, an elite boys'-only school located in the north of Tehran, Iran
Nikan, a Manchu exonym for China
 Nikan Wailan (Manchu: ᠨᡳᡴᠠᠨ ᠸᠠᡳᠯᠠᠨ) a Jurchen leader affiliated with the Ming Dynasty and a rival of Nurhaci